Roxanne Qualls (born March 3, 1953) is currently an Executive Sales Vice President with Sibcy Cline Realtors in Cincinnati OH. 

She is a former Democratic mayor of Cincinnati, Ohio, having served from December 1993 to November 1999. She also served a two-year term on the Cincinnati City Council prior to her service as mayor, having been elected in 1991. On August 8, 2007, the Charter Committee announced her appointment to fill the unexpired term of council member Jim Tarbell. Qualls was elected to a two-year term on Cincinnati City Council in November 2007, and again in 2009 and 2011. She served as Vice Mayor, the chair of the Budget and Finance Committee, chair of the Livable Communities Committee and chair of the Subcommittee on Major Transportation and Infrastructure Projects.

She returned to Cincinnati City Council in 2007, where she focused on initiatives that are fundamental to building a strong Cincinnati and result in enhanced quality of life, a globally competitive local economy, and smart management of city resources. Her Great Neighborhoods Initiative used the best approaches from around the country to strengthen and revitalize Cincinnati's neighborhoods by giving communities innovative, new tools to protect neighborhood character while encouraging investment. She worked to develop a 21st-century transportation system that reinforces walkable neighborhoods and increases investment in multi-modal transportation systems that accommodate public transportation, bicycles, and pedestrians. Qualls worked to ensure that the I-75/Brent Spence Bridge project supports economic development in Cincinnati neighborhoods. She started the Homeless to Homes Initiative to take homeless men and women off the streets and help them become productive members of our community.

She was a candidate in the November 2013 election for Mayor of Cincinnati, but was defeated by John Cranley.

Background
Qualls was born in Tacoma, Washington. She grew up across the river from Cincinnati in the community of Erlanger, Kentucky. Her parents settled in Erlanger after her father retired from the Air Force when Roxanne was seven years old. Prior to arriving in Kentucky, she had lived in Taiwan, Japan, and New Hampshire.

She attended St. Henry's Grade School in Erlanger and then attended Notre Dame Academy in Park Hills, Kentucky for high school. While at Notre Dame Academy, she excelled in public speaking and debate as a member of the school's chapter of the National Forensics League and was a member of the National Honor Society. She attended Thomas More College for three semesters majoring in history and then attended the University of Cincinnati in the Department of Urban Planning and Design at the College of Design, Architecture, Art, and Planning.

Early career
Prior to serving in elective office, Roxanne was the first Director of the Northern Kentucky Rape Crisis Center (1975–1977, now known as the Women's Crisis Center, Kentucky), the Executive Director of Women Helping Women (1977–1979, now known as the Hamilton County Rape Crisis and Abuse Center), owned a small business specializing in house painting and renovation, and served as an Associate Director (1983–1985) and then Director (1985–1991) of the Cincinnati office of Ohio Citizen Action (formerly known as Ohio Public Interest Campaign). While director of Ohio Citizen Action's Cincinnati office, Roxanne worked with neighborhood groups and environmental organizations to pass the City of Cincinnati's air code, lobbied the city to establish the Office of Environmental Management, and advocated for the establishment of the city's recycling program. Her office released an annual analysis of the Environmental Protection Agency's Toxic Release Inventory. She served as a member of the Lower Price Hill Task Force, a collaborative effort to target the environmental causes of Lower Price Hill children's health problems.

Cincinnati City Council, 1991–1993
Roxanne Qualls first ran for the nine-member at-large Cincinnati City Council in 1987. She placed 14th.  She ran again in 1989 and placed 10th. She was elected in 1991.
 
In her first term on council, Roxanne served as chair of the Intergovernmental Affairs and Environment Committee. She promoted employee health and safety, successfully advocating that the city adopt Occupational Health and Safety Administration standards for city workers and develop an effective loss prevention program. She led the city's planning efforts to develop a long-term transportation policy that included mass transit. She worked to establish the Toxic Sweep program that trained city inspectors to recognize threats from hazardous and toxic waste. In addition, she emphasized increased cooperation between the City of Cincinnati and Hamilton County and organized regular meeting between her committee and the County Commission on issues of shared concern.

Mayor of Cincinnati, 1993–1999
In 1993, Roxanne became Mayor of the City of Cincinnati by achieving the highest number of votes of any council member. Cincinnati's voters returned her to the Mayor's office in 1995 and in 1997 where she served until term limits forced her out of office.

As Mayor, Roxanne emphasized openness and accessibility, collaborative public-private partnerships, and community and economic development.

Upon taking the office of Mayor in 1993, Roxanne established "Mayor's Night In" where every Tuesday evening for two hours anyone could come and see her about any issue or concern; and she established the Mayor's Business Expansion and Retention Program and the Mayor's Business Breakfasts. These efforts reached out to over 1,000 individuals and 240 businesses and resulted in legislative initiatives, constituency services, and jobs and business expansion and retention.

She emphasized partnerships with the communities and the private sector to achieve shared goals. The partnership with the Greater Cincinnati Home Builders Association resulted in Citirama, a center city home show that has created new neighborhoods and brought people back to the city. A partnership with the Board of Realtors produced the Ambassador Program that familiarized real estate agents with the assets of Cincinnati so as to be better able to "sell" the city. The US Conference of Mayors recognized this programs as a "Best Practice" in 2005. She established the Home Ownership Partnership, a coalition of over 32 lending institutions and community development organizations to improve Cincinnati's rate of home ownership.

Believing that successful community and economic development is built on a foundation of safety and security, Roxanne developed the Zero Tolerance Initiative: A Campaign to Take Back Our Neighborhoods, a comprehensive effort to combat blight and neighborhood deterioration. It was recognized by the US Conference of Mayors as a, "Best Practice" in 1999. She initiated Cincinnati's suit against gun manufacturers for failing to incorporate safety features into guns and for facilitating the illegal distribution of guns. She supported the hiring of more police officers and the Community Oriented Policing (COP) program that took police officers out of cars and put them on the street in neighborhoods. Also, she proposed the Permitting Drug Abuse ordinance to hold property owners responsible for knowingly permitting drug trafficking on their property.

Successful community and economic development also requires a willingness to invest in the physical, cultural, and social infrastructure of the city. As Mayor and as a member of the Executive Committee, and later as President of the Ohio-Kentucky-Indiana Regional Council of Governments, she oversaw the Major Investment Study that resulted in the significant redesign and reconfiguration of Fort Washington Way; and, she successfully lobbied for federal dollars to fund the region's light rail major investment study. With then-County Commissioner Bob Bedinghaus and members of City Council, she helped form the joint City-County Planning Committee to develop the Master Plan for Cincinnati's Central Riverfront and to determine the location of the two stadiums. In 1998, she ensured the expansion of the city's premier riverfront park system by insuring that money was budgeted for the construction of the Theodore M. Berry International Friendship Park.

Roxanne was recognized for her strong supports of Cincinnati's arts and cultural community. She was one of three founders of Artworks, a youth employment program that teaches young people work skills by producing public art. She supported the construction of the internationally recognized Contemporary Arts Center, the Aronoff Performing Arts Center, and the National Underground Railroad Freedom Center, and supported funding of small arts organizations.

In 1998, Roxanne was an unsuccessful candidate for Congress. When she completed her last term in office, Roxanne pursued her dual passions of policy and urban design and planning. She served as a Fellow in the Institute of Politics at Harvard Kennedy School (Spring 2000); she served as a 2001 member of the Loeb Fellowship in Environmental Studies at Harvard's Graduate School of Design; and she graduated in 2002 from the Kennedy School with a Master's in Public Administration.

Recent activities
Qualls currently is an Executive Sales Vice President with Sibcy Cline Realtors in Cincinnati OH. She received her Ohio real estate license in 2010. She is licensed in Ohio and Kentucky.

Qualls served as a Visiting Professor at Northern Kentucky University from 2004 to 2007. She taught in the Masters in Public Administration Program. She taught Executive Management, Urban Policy, and Citizens and Governance. In 2005, she became Director of Public Leadership Initiatives.  Under her direction, NKU's Institute for Public Leadership and Public Affairs has presented New Leadership Kentucky, a three-day residential program in political leadership for undergraduate women from Kentucky and the Greater Cincinnati metropolitan area.  This non-partisan, non-ideological program was developed by the Center for American Women in Politics.  In 2007, the Institute began the Advancing Women in Political Leadership project in collaboration with the Women's Fund of the Greater Cincinnati Foundation.

Professional achievements

Awards and honors
 Post-Corbett Award Special Award in Arts Education for Artworks, 1997
 National Homebuilders Association, Public Official of the Year, Region C, 1997
 Project Interchange Seminars in Israel, American Jewish Committee, Women Leaders Exchange, 1997
 Honorary Doctorate, Cincinnati State Technical and Community College, 1996
 Ohio Public Employees Lawyers Association Award for Outstanding Service, 1996
 National Association of Social Workers, Public Official of the Year, State and Cincinnati Region, 1996
 YWCA, Women of Achievement Award, 1994
 Cincinnati Women's Political Caucus, Outstanding Achievement Award, 1994
 Soroptimist Club, Making a Difference for Women Award, 1993
 Girl Scouts Great Rivers Council Woman of Distinction, 1992

Continuing education
 Loeb Fellowship in Environmental Studies, Graduate School of Design, Harvard University, Class of 2001
 Fellow Institute of Politics, Kennedy School of Government, Harvard University, 2000
 Institute for New Mayors, Harvard University, 1993
 Mayors Institute on City Design, Harvard University, 1996
 Mayors Institute on City Design, University of Virginia, 1997

Board memberships
 Southwest Ohio Regional Transit Authority (SORTA), Board Member (2007) 
 Urban League of Greater Cincinnati, Board Member (2006–2007)
 Vision 2015 Regional Stewardship Council, Board Member (2006–)  
 Great Rivers Girl Scout Council, Board Member (2006–2007)
 Housing Opportunities Made Equal, Board Member (2005–2007) 
 ArtWorks, Board Member (2005–2007)
 Congress for New Urbanism, Board Member (2000–2008) 
 The Holocaust Memorial Library, Hebrew Union College-Jewish Institute of Religion (2000–2002)     
 Christ Church Cathedral, Cincinnati, Ohio, Vestry Member (1998–2000)
 National Association of Regional Councils (NARC), First Vice President (1997–1999), Second Vice President (1996–1997), Board Member (1995–1999)
 Cincinnati Youth Collaborative, Co-Chair (1993–1999)
 Friends of Women's Studies (University of Cincinnati), Honorary Chair (1993–1994)
 March of Dimes Health Professional Advisory Committee, Member (1993–1994)
 Ohio•Kentucky•Indiana Regional Council of Governments, President (1995, 1996), First Vice President (1994), Second Vice President (1993), Executive Committee (1992–1999)
 Shuttlesworth Housing Foundation, Advisory Board (1991), Board Member (1989–1991)
 Governor's Commission on the Storage and Use of Toxic and Hazardous Materials, Member (1990)
 Cincinnati Metropolitan Housing Authority, Chairperson (1990–1991), Commissioner (1988–1991)
 Lower Price Hill Task Force, Member (1989–1992) 
 Solid Waste Advisory Committee of the State of Ohio, Member (1988–1991)
 Governor's Waste Minimization Task Force of the State of Ohio, Member (1987–1990)
 Solid Waste Task Force of the City of Cincinnati, Chairperson (1988–1990), Member and Vice Chair (1987–1988)
 Hazardous Material Advisory Committee of the City of Cincinnati, Member (1985–1988)
 Rape Services Subcommittee of the Women's Service Implementation Committee of the United Way-Community Chest, Member (1979)    
 Cincinnati Committee of the United Methodist Church's Board of Global Ministries Child and Family Justice Project, Vice-Chair (1978–1979)
 Covington Family Health Clinic, Board Member (1976–1977) 
 Northern Kentucky Catholic Commission of Social Justice, Board Member (1973–1978)

See also
 Election Results, City Council of Cincinnati, Ohio
 Election Results, U.S. Representative from Ohio, 1st District

Notes

External links
 Charter Committee (local Cincinnati political party)

1953 births
Mayors of Cincinnati
People from Kenton County, Kentucky
Women mayors of places in Ohio
Living people
Thomas More University alumni
University of Cincinnati alumni
Cincinnati City Council members
Harvard Kennedy School alumni
Politicians from Tacoma, Washington
20th-century American politicians
21st-century American politicians
20th-century American women politicians
21st-century American women politicians
Harvard Graduate School of Design alumni
Women city councillors in Ohio